Ronald Oneil Spence, Jr. (born September 14, 1992), professionally known as Ronny J (formerly stylized as RONNYJLI$TENUP), is an American record producer, singer, rapper, and songwriter. He has worked with well-known artists such as  Denzel Curry, XXXTentacion, Token, Lil Pump, Bhad Bhabie, Juice Wrld, Sfera Ebbasta, 6ix9ine, Ski Mask the Slump God, Eminem, Machine Gun Kelly, Iggy Azalea, and Kanye West. Ronny is known for his signature producer tags, one featuring a woman exclaiming, "Oh my God, Ronny!" and another one featuring a snippet from rapper UnoTheActivist saying "Ronny J, please turn me up.”

Early life
Ronald Oneil Spence, Jr. was born in Camden, New Jersey on September 14, 1992. He grew up in Woodbury, New Jersey, where he used to play drums in nursery, which got him interested in music. Ronny attended Rowan College at Gloucester County while still living in New Jersey where he met fellow Rose boy Corte$4Prez. He was also into arts and architecture before pursuing his music career. He moved to Miami, where he became part of Denzel Curry's group, C9 and Raider Klan.

Career

2017–present: OMGRONNY and Jupiter
In May 2017, Ronny J signed a deal with Independently Popular and Atlantic Records. On February 23, 2018, he released his first mixtape under Atlantic, OMGRONNY. On August 14, 2020, he released his debut studio album, Jupiter.

Production discography

Charted singles

Discography

Studio albums
Jupiter (2020)
No Name (with Lil Pump) (2021)

Mixtapes
OMGRonny (2018)

References

External links
 

1992 births
Living people
Record producers from New Jersey
Songwriters from New Jersey
Musicians from Camden, New Jersey
African-American male rappers
Rappers from New Jersey
21st-century American rappers
21st-century American male musicians
People from Woodbury, New Jersey
African-American record producers
21st-century African-American musicians
American male songwriters